V-shaped passage graves  are a type of megalithic chamber tomb found in parts of Atlantic Europe including Ireland, the Channel Islands and Brittany. They date to between 3500 and 2500BC.

They are similar to Wedge-shaped gallery graves in that in plan they have a narrow entrance that widens out inside into a burial chamber. The entrance passage and the burial chamber are distinguished by sill stones however meaning that they are part of the passage grave tradition. 

In some cases a small sub chamber leads off from the main chamber.

Examples include "La Varde" and Le Creux es Faies on Guernsey and "Le Ruen" and "Ty-ar-Boudiquet" in Brtittany.

References

Further reading
 

Stone Age Britain
Burial monuments and structures